Narrandera Shire is a local government area in the Riverina region of south-western New South Wales, Australia. The Shire is located adjacent to the Sturt and Newell Highways.

The present Narrandera Shire was formed on 1 January 1960 by an amalgamation of the previous Narrandera Municipality and Yanko Shire. The first Narrandera Municipality was incorporated on 18 March 1885.

The Shire includes the town of Narrandera and the villages of Grong Grong, Binya and Barellan.

The mayor of Narrandera Shire is Cr. Neville Kschenka, an independent politician.

Council

Current composition and election method
Narrandera Shire Council is composed of nine councillors elected proportionally as a single ward. All councillors are elected for a fixed four-year term of office. The mayor is elected by the councillors at the first meeting of the council. The most recent election was held on 10 September 2016. The makeup of the council is as follows:

The current Council, elected in 2016, in order of election, is:

Mayors

Mayors of Narrandera Council (1885–1959)
The list of mayors of Narrandera Council (1885–1959) appears below.

Mayors of Narrandera Shire (1960–present)
The list of mayors of Narrandera Shire Council (1960–present) appears below.

References 

 
Local government areas of the Riverina
Local government areas of New South Wales
1960 establishments in Australia
Newell Highway